Night is the 16th solo piano album (and 20th overall) by New Age pianist pianist George Winston, released in the U.S. on May 6, 2022 by RCA/Dancing Cat records. It reached number 16 on the Billboard Jazz Albums chart.

Track listing

References

External links
 Night liner notes

2022 albums
George Winston albums